Bell Island is one of the Grey Islands, located off Newfoundland's Great Northern Peninsula to the east in the Atlantic Ocean. With an area of 88 km2. The island is hilly, rising to over 152 m. (500 ft). The village of Grey Islands Harbour is situated at the southern end of the island.

See also
Humber—St. Barbe—Baie Verte
List of islands of Newfoundland and Labrador

Sources

"Grey Islands". The Columbia Gazetteer of North America, 2000.

Islands of Newfoundland and Labrador